Markström is a Swedish surname. Notable people with the surname include:

Elisebeht Markström, (born 1955), Swedish social democratic politician who has been a member of the Riksdag since 1995
Hans Markström (born 1965), former ice speed skater from Sweden
Jacob Markström (born 1990), Swedish professional ice hockey goaltender, currently playing for the Calgary Flames

Swedish-language surnames